Nakasone is a Japanese surname. Notable people with the surname include:

Hirofumi Nakasone (born 1945), former Japanese Minister of Foreign Affairs, son of Yasuhiro Nakasone
Keith Nakasone (born 1956), American competitive judoka
Michael Nakasone, American band director
Paul Miki Nakasone (born 1963), chief of United States Cyber Command, Chief of the Central Security Service and director of the National Security Agency.
Rino Nakasone (born 1979), Japanese dancer and choreographer
Nakasone Toyomiya, Aji of the Miyako Islands
Yasuhiro Nakasone (1918–2019), 71st to 73rd Prime Minister of Japan

Japanese-language surnames